On April 20–22, 1912, a large tornado outbreak affected portions of the High Plains, the Upper Midwest, and the Southern United States, including portions of what is now known as the Dallas–Fort Worth metroplex. The severe-weather event produced at least 32 tornadoes, at least nine—and possibly 10 or more—of which were violent tornadoes, all of which rated F4 on the Fujita scale. Powerful tornado activity was distributed from the Great Plains to South Carolina. The first day of the outbreak occurred on April 20 and produced numerous strong to violent tornadoes across parts of North Texas, Oklahoma, and Kansas. A second day of intense tornadoes occurred on April 21, with several strong to violent tornadoes across Illinois and Indiana. The final day, April 22, produced an F4 tornado in Georgia as well. The entire outbreak killed 56 people, and was followed days later by another intense tornado outbreak on April 27. That outbreak killed about 40 people, mostly in Oklahoma. Both outbreaks produced a combined total of nine F4 tornadoes in Oklahoma alone.

Confirmed tornadoes

April 20 event

April 21 event

April 22 event

See also
List of North American tornadoes and tornado outbreaks
Tornado outbreak of April 27–29, 1912 – Impacted much of the same region

Notes

References

Sources

Tornadoes of 1912
Tornadoes in Oklahoma
F4 tornadoes by date
History of Oklahoma
1912 natural disasters in the United States
1912 in Oklahoma
Tornado outbreak